Some of the technological applications of superconductivity include:
 the production of sensitive  magnetometers based on SQUIDs (superconducting quantum interference devices)
 fast digital circuits (including those based on Josephson junctions and rapid single flux quantum technology),
 powerful superconducting electromagnets used in maglev trains, magnetic resonance imaging (MRI) and nuclear magnetic resonance (NMR) machines, magnetic confinement fusion reactors (e.g. tokamaks), and the beam-steering and focusing magnets used in particle accelerators
 low-loss power cables
 RF and microwave filters (e.g., for mobile phone base stations, as well as military ultra-sensitive/selective receivers)
 fast fault current limiters
 high sensitivity particle detectors, including the transition edge sensor, the superconducting bolometer, the superconducting tunnel junction detector, the kinetic inductance detector, and the superconducting nanowire single-photon detector
 railgun and coilgun magnets
 electric motors and generators

Low-temperature superconductivity

Magnetic resonance imaging (MRI) and nuclear magnetic resonance (NMR)
The biggest application for superconductivity is in producing the large-volume, stable, and high-intensity magnetic fields required for MRI and NMR.  This represents a multi-billion-US$ market for companies such as Oxford Instruments and Siemens.  The magnets typically use low-temperature superconductors (LTS) because high-temperature superconductors are not yet cheap enough to cost-effectively deliver the high, stable, and large-volume fields required, notwithstanding the need to cool LTS instruments to liquid helium temperatures.  Superconductors are also used in high field scientific magnets.

Particle accelerators and magnetic fusion devices
Particle accelerators such as the Large Hadron Collider can include many high field electromagnets requiring large quantities of LTS. To construct the LHC magnets required more than 28 percent of the world's niobium-titanium wire production for five years, with large quantities of NbTi also used in the magnets for the LHC's huge experiment detectors.

Conventional fusion machines (JET, ST-40, NTSX-U and MAST) use blocks of copper.  This limits their fields to 1-3 Tesla.  Several superconducting fusion machines are planned for the 2024-2026 timeframe.  These include ITER, ARC and the next version of ST-40.  The addition of High Temperature Superconductors should yield an order of magnitude improvement in fields (10-13 tesla) for a new generation of Tokamaks.

High-temperature superconductivity (HTS) 
The commercial applications so far for high temperature superconductors (HTS) have been limited.

HTS require only liquid nitrogen, not liquid helium, to cool to superconducting temperatures.  However, the problem with HTS technology is that the currently known high temperature superconductors are brittle ceramics which are expensive to manufacture and not easily formed into wires or other useful shapes.
Therefore, the applications for HTS have been where it has some other intrinsic advantage, e.g. in
 low thermal loss current leads for LTS devices (low thermal conductivity),
 RF and microwave filters (low resistance to RF), and 
 increasingly in specialist scientific magnets, particularly where size and electricity consumption are critical (while HTS wire is much more expensive than LTS in these applications, this can be offset by the relative cost and convenience of cooling); the ability to ramp field is desired (the higher and wider range of HTS's operating temperature means faster changes in field can be managed); or cryogen free operation is desired (LTS generally requires liquid helium that is becoming more scarce and expensive).

HTS-based systems 
HTS has application in scientific and industrial magnets, including use in NMR and MRI systems.  Commercial systems are now available in each category.

Also one intrinsic attribute of HTS is that it can withstand much higher magnetic fields than LTS, so HTS at liquid helium temperatures are being explored for very high-field inserts inside LTS magnets.

Promising future industrial and commercial HTS applications include Induction heaters, transformers, fault current limiters, power storage, motors and generators, fusion reactors (see ITER) and magnetic levitation devices.

Early applications will be where the benefit of smaller size, lower weight or the ability to rapidly switch current (fault current limiters) outweighs the added cost. Longer-term as conductor price falls HTS systems should be competitive in a much wider range of applications on energy efficiency grounds alone.  (For a relatively technical and US-centric view of state of play of HTS technology in power systems and the development status of Generation 2 conductor see Superconductivity for Electric Systems 2008 US DOE Annual Peer Review.)

Electric power transmission

Holbrook Superconductor Project 
The Holbrook Superconductor Project, also known as the LIPA project, is a project to design and build the world's first production superconducting transmission power cable. The cable was commissioned in late June 2008 by the Long Island Power Authority (LIPA). In addition, the installation of the cable eluded strict permission complications for overhead power lines, and offered a solution for the public's concerns for overhead power lines.

Tres Amigas Project 
American Superconductor was chosen for the Tres Amigas Project, the United States’ first renewable energy market hub. The Tres Amigas renewable energy market hub will be a multi-mile, triangular electricity pathway of superconductor electricity pipelines capable of transferring and balancing many gigawatts of power between three U.S. power grids (the Eastern Interconnection, the Western Interconnection and the Texas Interconnection). Unlike traditional powerlines, it will transfer power as DC instead of AC current. It will be located in Clovis, New Mexico.

Essen inner city 
Essen, Germany has the world's longest superconducting power cable in production at 1 kilometer.  It is a 10 kV liquid nitrogen cooled cable. The cable is smaller than an equivalent 110 kV regular cable and the lower voltage has the additional benefit of smaller transformers.

Voerde aluminium plant 
An aluminium plant in Voerde, Germany plans to use superconductors for cables carrying 200 kA, citing lower volume and material demand as advantages.

Magnesium diboride 
Magnesium diboride is a much cheaper superconductor than either BSCCO or YBCO in terms of cost per current-carrying capacity per length (cost/(kA*m)), in the same ballpark as LTS, and on this basis many manufactured wires are already cheaper than copper.  Furthermore, MgB2 superconducts at temperatures higher than LTS (its critical temperature is 39 K, compared with less than 10 K for NbTi and 18.3 K for Nb3Sn), introducing the possibility of using it at 10-20 K in cryogen-free magnets or perhaps eventually in liquid hydrogen. However MgB2 is limited in the magnetic field it can tolerate at these higher temperatures, so further research is required to demonstrate its competitiveness in higher field applications.

Trapped field magnets
Exposing superconducting materials to a brief magnetic field can trap the field for use in machines such as generators. In some applications they could replace traditional permanent magnets.

Notes 

Superconductivity